Riparia is an extinct town in Whitman County, in the U.S. state of Washington. The GNIS classifies it as a populated place.

A post office called Riparia was in operation between 1882 and 1963. The community most likely took its name from a nearby riparian zone.

References

Ghost towns in Washington (state)
Geography of Whitman County, Washington